Peter Gambi is a character appearing in comics published by DC Comics and is a supporting character of Black Lightning. He is the brother of Paul Gambi. Peter Gambi first appeared in Black Lightning #1 and was created by Tony Isabella and Trevor von Eeden.

Gambi appears in the live action Arrowverse series Black Lightning, portrayed by James Remar.

Fictional character biography
Peter Gambi is a former ASA scout who turned his back on his life of crime, he became a tailor like his brother Paul Gambi. Peter established a tailor shop and befriended Pierce and his mother. When Tobias Whale orders the death of a student to threaten Pierce after the latter spoke out against the 100's criminal activities, Jefferson seeks Gambi's advice to avenge the victim. Gambi creates the costume that enables him to become Black Lightning.

Syonide captures Gambi and tries to force him to reveal Black Lightning's true identity.

Jefferson learns that Gambi was the one who killed his father. Gambi begs unsuccessfully for Black Lightning's forgiveness. Whale sends Syonide to kill Gambi and Black Lightning. Gambi sacrifices his life to save Black Lightning, and Pierce forgives him as he dies.

In other media
 Peter Gambi appears in the "Thunder and Lightning" segments of DC Nation Shorts, voiced by Jeff Bennett.
 Peter Gambi appears in Black Lightning, portrayed by James Remar. This version, named Peter Esposito, used to work for the A.S.A. as their metahuman spotter before leaving the group, becoming a tailor and an ally of Black Lightning. He raised Jefferson Pierce after his father was killed by Tobias. In season three, Gambi helps Anissa out with her Blackbird operations where he event created the A.I. Shonda for her apartment. To get close to the A.S.A, Gambi uses the holographic cloaking technology to assume the appearance of a random soldier. After finding Painkiller's grave empty, he and Lynn find that Painkiller was revived by the A.S.A. and was reprogrammed to serve them. In "The Book of Resistance: Chapter Four: Earth Crisis," Gambi helps to stabilize Jennifer after she was exposed to the red sky's anti-matter energies. When an anti-matter wave appears, Gambi is among those erased while Jefferson is teleported off his Earth.

References

External links
 Peter Gambi at DC Comics Wiki
 Peter Gambi at Comic Vine

DC Comics characters
Comics characters introduced in 1977
Fictional tailors
Characters created by Tony Isabella